Ciribul (also, Cirimbel, Dzherembel’, Dzherimbel’, and Dzhirimbel’) is a village in the Yardymli Rayon of Azerbaijan. The village forms part of the municipality of Şəfəqli.

References 

Populated places in Yardimli District